Aldo Dolcetti (born 23 October 1966 in Salò, Brescia Province, Italy) is an Italian football manager and former player, who played as a midfielder.

Career

Playing career 
Dolcetti began as a youngster at Juventus but spent a season at Novara before signing for Pisa in 1987. He was a central player for Pisa in two spells in Serie A, before brief spells with Messina and Lucchese. He joined Cesena in 1993 and was, along with Dario Hubner and Emiliano Salvetti, part of a side which came close to promotion to Serie A in 1994. After Cesena's relegation in 1997, he had brief spells at Savoia and Ascoli.

Coaching career 
After his retired from playing football, Dolcetti was appointed head coach of Budapest Honvéd FC, Lecco, BFC Siófok, SPAL and Milan Primavera.

External links
Career Stats

1966 births
Living people
Italian footballers
Italian football managers
Budapest Honvéd FC managers
Calcio Lecco 1912 managers
Sportspeople from the Province of Brescia
Novara F.C. players
A.C. Cesena players
A.C.R. Messina players
Pisa S.C. players
S.S.D. Lucchese 1905 players
U.S. Avellino 1912 players
Serie A players
Association football midfielders
A.C. Milan non-playing staff
Juventus F.C. non-playing staff
Expatriate football managers in Hungary
Footballers from Lombardy